Hanna Solovey (born 31 January 1992) is a Ukrainian road and track racing cyclist, who currently rides for Ukrainian amateur team .

Career
Born in Luhansk, Solovey was banned in 2011 for 2 years after testing positive for performance-enhancing drug, Drostanolone.

Astana–Acca Due O (2015)

In June 2015,  fired Solovey citing "unprofessional behaviour". This was disputed, with the Ukrainian Cycling Federation, claiming she was fired for refusing to take up Kazakhstani citizenship ahead of the Rio 2016 Olympics. Alexander Vinokourov, the Astana manager, rejected the claim. Solovey did not qualify for the 2016 Olympics.

In June 2015, she competed in the inaugural European Games, for Ukraine in cycling. She earned a silver medal in the women's time trial.

Major results

Road

2009
 1st  Time trial, UCI Juniors World Championships
 2nd  Time trial, UEC European Junior Road Championships
2010
 UCI Juniors Road World Championships
1st  Time trial
4th Road race
 1st  Time trial, UEC European Junior Road Championships
 National Road Championships
1st  Time trial
2nd Hill climb
5th Road race
 1st Junior Chrono des Nations

2011
 1st  Time trial, National Road Championships
 2nd Chrono Gatineau

2013
 UEC European Under-23 Road Championships
1st  Time trial
3rd  Road race
 1st Chrono des Nations
 8th Time trial, UCI Road World Championships
2014
 1st Chrono Champenois-Trophée Européen
 1st Chrono des Nations
 UCI Road World Championships
2nd  Time trial
9th Road race
2015
 National Road Championships
1st  Time trial
3rd Road race
 European Games
2nd  Time trial
10th Road race
 2nd Chrono des Nations
 4th Chrono Gatineau
 8th Strade Bianche
2016
 National Road Championships
2nd Time trial
3rd Road race
 3rd Horizon Park Women Challenge
 3rd VR Women ITT
 6th Overall Emakumeen Euskal Bira
 7th Overall Auensteiner–Radsporttage
 8th Overall Giro della Toscana Int. Femminile – Memorial Michela Fanini
 9th Overall Holland Ladies Tour
2017
 1st VR Women ITT
 National Road Championships
2nd Time trial
6th Road race
 3rd Borsele ITT
 5th Overall Tour de Feminin-O cenu Českého Švýcarska
 9th Overall Tour Cycliste Féminin International de l'Ardèche
2018
 3rd Overall Tour of Eftalia Hotels & Velo Alanya
 4th VR Women ITT
 7th Horizon Park Women Challenge
2019
 5th Kievskaya Sotka Women Challenge
 7th Overall Gracia–Orlová
 7th Chabany Race
2020
 5th Grand Prix Gazipaşa
2021
 2nd Time trial, National Road Championships
 6th Grand Prix Velo Alanya
2022
 8th Grand Prix Gazipaşa

Track

2009
 3rd  Individual pursuit, UCI Juniors Track World Championships
2010
 6th Team pursuit, 2010–11 UCI Track Cycling World Cup Classics, Melbourne
 8th Team pursuit, UEC European Track Championships

2011
 8th Team pursuit, UCI Track World Championships

2013
 National Track Championships
1st  Omnium
3rd 500m time trial
 1st Omnium, Grand Prix of Poland
 Copa Internacional de Pista
1st Individual pursuit
1st Team pursuit
2nd Omnium
 2nd  Team pursuit, UEC European Under-23 Track Championships
2014
 Grand Prix Galychyna
1st Individual pursuit
2nd Omnium

References

External links
 
 
 
 
 
 

1992 births
Living people
Sportspeople from Luhansk
Ukrainian female cyclists
Doping cases in cycling
Ukrainian sportspeople in doping cases
Cyclists at the 2015 European Games
European Games medalists in cycling
Cyclists at the 2019 European Games
European Games gold medalists for Ukraine
European Games silver medalists for Ukraine
Cyclists at the 2016 Summer Olympics
Olympic cyclists of Ukraine
20th-century Ukrainian women
21st-century Ukrainian women